The men's 200 metre breaststroke event at the 2014 Commonwealth Games as part of the swimming programme took place on 24 July at the Tollcross International Swimming Centre in Glasgow, Scotland.

The medals were presented by Michael Cavanagh, Chairman of Commonwealth Games Scotland and the quaichs were presented by Louise Martin, Honorary Secretary of the Commonwealth Games Federation, Immediate Past Chair of Commonwealth Games Scotland and Vice-Chair of Glasgow 2014.

Records
Prior to this competition, the existing world and Commonwealth Games records were as follows.

The following records were established during the competition:

Results

Heats

Final

References

External links

Men's 200 metre breaststroke
Commonwealth Games